is a Japanese television drama series and the 101st Asadora series, following Natsuzora. It premiered on September 30, 2019, and concluded on March 28, 2020.

Plot 
This asadora follows the life and career of Kimiko Kawahara (played as an adult by Erika Toda) pioneering the way for women in the male-dominated field of ceramics in Japan after World War II. The story centres around Shiga Prefecture and the pottery town of Shigaraki.

In 1947, 9-year-old Kimiko (played as a child by Yukawa Kawashima) came to Shigaraki from Osaka with her father Joji (played by Kazuki Kitamura), mother Matsu (played by Tomita Tomoko), and two sisters. Joji was fleeing from debt collectors due to a business failure as a result of the war. As they settle into life in rural Shiga, Kimiko, who is very curious, is inspired by the pottery work in Shigaraki. However, initially Kimiko goes to school, takes care of her sisters and helps her mother with the housework. Joji found work in the transport industry, but the Kawahara family was still poor. Because of this, Joji brings a young man named Soichiro Kusama (played by Ryuta Sato) to board in the household. Kimiko finds inspiration from Kusama, who in turn praises her drawing work.

Eventually, the debt collectors trace Joji to Shigaraki...

As an adult, Kimiko marries another ceramicist and has one son (that later died of leukemia) but continues to pursue her dreams of working in ceramics and seeks to create her own unique style.

Cast

Kawahara's family 
 Erika Toda as Kimiko Kawahara
 Yua Kawashima as young Kimiko
 Kazuki Kitamura as Jōji Kawahara, Kimiko's father
 Yasuko Tomita as Matsu Kawahara, Kimiko's mother
 Nanami Sakuraba as Naoko Kawahara, Kimiko's sister
 Natsumi Yakuwa as young Naoko
 Mayuko Fukuda as Yuriko Kawahara, Kimiko's younger sister

Shigaraki people 
 Yūko Oshima as Teruko Kumagai, Kimiko's childhood friend
 Naho Yokomizo as young Teruko
 Kento Hayashi as Shinsaku Ōno, Kimiko's childhood friend
 Kenshin Nakamura, as young Shinsaku
 Naomi Zaizen as Yōko Ōno, Shinsaku's mother
 Magy as Takenobu Ōno, Shinsaku's father and store owner

Osaka people 
 Miki Mizuno as Chiyaki Andō, a journalist
 Junpei Mizobata as Keisuke Sakata
 Takehiro Kimoto as Yutarō Tanaka
 Aki Hano as Sada Araki, a mistress and designer
 Kyōko Mitsubayashi as Nobuko Ōkubo, a former maid of Araki's mansion
 Takanori Nishikawa as George Fujikawa, a world-renowned artist

Others 
 Ryuta Satō as Sōichirō Kusama
 Kōhei Matsushita as Hachirō Soyoda
 Issey Ogata as Shinsen Fukano
 Kentaro Ito as Takeshi Kawahara, Kimiko's son
 Goro Inagaki as Dr. Shigeyoshi Ōsaki
 Ruka Matsuda as Mana Ishii

References

External links 
 Official website (in Japanese)

2019 Japanese television series debuts
2020 Japanese television series endings
Asadora
Television shows set in Osaka